Micropholis sanctae-rosae is a species of plant in the family Sapotaceae. It is found in Brazil, French Guiana, and Peru.

References

sanctae-rosae
Least concern plants
Trees of Peru
Taxonomy articles created by Polbot
Taxa named by Charles Baehni